Live at Umbria Jazz was released in 2002 in Brazil by João Gilberto. The album was recorded live at the Umbria Jazz Festival at the Teatro Morlacchi in Perugia, Italy on 21 July 1996.

Track listing

Personnel 
 Guitar/Vocals - João Gilberto

References 

Gridley, Mark. Jazz Styles: History and Analysis. 9th. NJ: Pearson Prentice Hall, Print.

2002 live albums
João Gilberto live albums
Antônio Carlos Jobim albums